Benjamin Carrington FRSE FLS MRCS (18 January 1827 – 18 January 1893) was a leading British botanist and taxonomist in the late 19th century. He was a specialist in bryophytes, cryptogams, fungi and lichens, and wrote extensively on these subjects.

Life

He was born on 18 January 1827 in Lincoln, England. He studied medicine at the University of Edinburgh, and graduated with the MD thesis "Entophytes found on man" in 1851. He worked as a General Practitioner variously in Radcliffe (near Manchester), Lincoln, Yeadon, Southport and Eccles, but he is remembered for his contributions to botany as an amateur collector and author.

In 1861 he was elected a Fellow of the Linnean Society and he was elected a Fellow of the Royal Society of Edinburgh in 1874, his proposers including Joseph Lister.

He died on his 66th birthday in Brighton on 18 January 1893. He is buried in Carlton Hill Cemetery in Brighton.

Artistic recognition

His portrait is held by the University of Manchester.

Other positions held
President of the Manchester Cryptogamic Society

Publications
The Cryptogams (1862)
Gleanings Amongst the Irish Cryptogams (1863)
Notes on the Cyperaceae (1863)

References

1827 births
1893 deaths
Fellows of the Royal Society of Edinburgh
Alumni of the University of Edinburgh